Pickering Nuclear Generating Station is a Canadian nuclear power station located on the north shore of Lake Ontario in Pickering, Ontario. It is one of the oldest nuclear power stations in the world and Canada's third-largest, consisting of eight CANDU reactors. Since 2003, two of these units have been defueled and the remaining six produce about 16% of Ontario's power and employ 3,000 workers.

Located at the Pickering station until October 2019 was a single 1.8 MWe wind turbine named the OPG 7 commemorative turbine. The turbine was dismantled in stages during October 2019

Reactor codification

The reactors can be classified as follows:

PICKERING A
 PICKERING A 1
 PICKERING A 2 (Safe Shutdown state, defuelled)
 PICKERING A 3 (Safe Shutdown state, defuelled)
 PICKERING A 4

PICKERING B
 PICKERING B 5
 PICKERING B 6
 PICKERING B 7
 PICKERING B 8

Construction

The site was once Squires Beach located west of Duffins Creek. The facility was constructed in stages between 1965 and 1986 by the provincial Crown corporation, Ontario Hydro, with significant completion of Station A scheduled for 1971.  In April 1999, Ontario Hydro was split into five component Crown corporations with Ontario Power Generation (OPG) taking over all electricity generating stations. OPG continues to operate the Pickering station.

Operation
The Pickering station is a large multi-unit nuclear facility, comprising six operating CANDU nuclear reactors with a total output of 3,114 MW when all units are on line, and two non-operating units with a total output of 1,030 MW currently shut down in safe storage. The facility is connected to the North American power grid via numerous 230 kV and 500 kV transmission lines.

The facility was operated as two distinct stations, Pickering A (Units 1 to 4) and Pickering B (Units 5 to 8) until 2011. While primarily administrative in nature, the division was not wholly artificial, as there are some distinct differences in design between the two groups of stations. (Example: The Pickering A units employ a moderator dump as a shutdown mechanism, a feature not found in Pickering B, which instead uses what is called an over-poisoned reaction guaranteed shutdown.)  There are, however, a number of systems and structures in common between the two stations; the most notable of these is the shared vacuum building, a negative pressure containment system. The operation of Pickering A and B was unified in 2010, to reduce costs now that Pickering A Units 2 and 3 are shut down in safe storage.

Electrical Output
The graph represents the annual electricity generation at the site (A and B combined) in TWh.

As of the end of 2021, the total lifetime output of the facility was 929.24 TWh.

Partial shutdown
On December 31, 1997 the four Pickering A reactors were shut down by Ontario Hydro and placed in lay up, suspending work on upgrades to the shutdown system.  Ontario Hydro committed to restarting the units, but the project underwent long delays and large cost over-runs.

Premier Mike Harris asked former federal energy Minister Jake Epp to study and make recommendations on the problems with the Pickering restart.  The review panel was established in May 2003.

Unit 4 was refurbished and then restarted in Sept. 2003. The election of the Ontario Liberal Party in October 2003 delayed action on the Epp report. In late 2003, the new government fired the top three executives of OPG for botching the Unit 4 restoration, which was years late and millions of dollars over budget.

Mr. Epp and the Pickering A Review Panel released their report in December 2003, which acknowledged the large cost over-runs and delays, attributing blame to bad management.  The Epp Review estimated the cost of restarting the remaining three reactors at $3 – 4 billion and supported the continuation of the project.

The government of Dalton McGuinty appointed Epp to the Ontario Power Generation Review headed by John Manley to examine the future role of Ontario Power Generation (OPG) in the province's electricity market, examine its corporate and management structure, and decide whether the public utility should proceed with refurbishing three more nuclear reactors at the Pickering nuclear power plant. The report recommended proceeding with the restart of Pickering “A” reactors 1, 2, and 3, sequentially.  The report argued that the restart of units 2 and 3 would be contingent on whether “OPG will be able to succeed at the Unit 1 project."

The McGuinty government accepted the OPG Review Committee's recommendation and allowed the refurbishment and restart of reactor 1, which still underwent cost over-runs and delays.

The anti-nuclear group Sierra Club of Canada criticized the 2004 OPG Review Committee report for not attributing any blame to the problems of nuclear technology, noting that there were no energy or environmental experts appointed to the panel.

Numerous changes in executive-level staff and project management strategy were made for the follow-on project to refurbish Unit 1. The experience of refurbishing Pickering A Unit 1 was significantly different from Unit 4, with a much tighter adherence to schedule and budget. In August 2005, the OPG Board of Directors announced that Units 2 and 3 would not be refurbished due to specific technical and cost risks surrounding the material condition of these two units. Unit 1 was returned to service in November 2005, providing 542 MW of generating capacity for Ontario's electricity system.

Costs

Construction Costs 
Ontario Hydro estimated the construction cost for the four Pickering "A" units at $508 million in 1965. Actual cost was $716 million (in 1971 dollars). The 1974 estimated cost for the four Pickering "B" units was $1.585 billion. Final cost was $3.846 billion (1986 dollars).

Refurbishment Costs 
According to Ontario's FAO, the cost for refurbishing Pickering A units deviated significantly from projections.
- Pickering Unit 4 was slated to cost $460 million and ultimately ended up costing $1.25 billion.
- Pickering Unit 1 was slated to cost $210 million and ultimately ended up costing $1.00 billion.

However, the figure presented by the FAO for Unit 1 doesn't align with that provided by Ontario Energy Minister, Dwight Duncan, who indicated that Pickering Unit 1 would cost $900 million, putting the completed project much closer to budget. This is supported by OPG stating that the project was completed on time and on budget.

Waste
The used nuclear fuel and some refurbishment waste generated by the plant sits on-site at the Pickering Waste Management Facility. All operational low and intermediate-level waste is transported to OPG's Western Waste Management Facility at the Bruce nuclear site near Kincardine, Ontario.  OPG has proposed the construction and operation of a deep geologic repository for the long-term storage of low and intermediate level waste on lands adjacent to the Western Waste Management Facility. The Nuclear Waste Management Organization is currently seeking a site for a potential repository for the used fuel from all Canadian nuclear reactors.

Records
- On October 7, 1994, Pickering Unit 7 set the world record for continuous runtime at 894 days, a record that stood for 22 years. It was surpassed by Heysham 2 unit 8 in 2016, a facility located in the UK, owned by EDF. This was subsequently surpassed by OPG's Darlington plant with Unit 1 running 1,106 consecutive days.
- In 2019, Pickering set a site capacity factor record of 87.07%, producing 23.6TWh and putting it roughly on-par with the much newer Darlington and Bruce facilities.

Future

In January 2016, the Province of Ontario approved plans to pursue continued operation of the Pickering Nuclear Generating Station to 2026.

OPG will work with the Ministry of Energy, the Independent Electricity System Operator and the Ontario Energy Board to pursue continued operation of the Pickering Station to 2024. All six units would operate until 2024; two units would then shut down and four units would operate to 2026. Extending Pickering's operation will ensure a reliable, clean source of base load electricity during refurbishment of the Darlington Nuclear Generating Station and the initial Bruce Nuclear refurbishments.

Any plan to extend Pickering's life requires approval from the Canadian Nuclear Safety Commission (CNSC). OPG is currently working on a licence application to the CNSC for approval in 2018.

After operation of Pickering concludes, OPG will begin the longer term decommissioning process as refurbishment will not be pursued. The first step in the long term decommissioning process is to layup the reactors and place them into safe storage. Pickering staff will have future employment opportunities placing the Pickering units in a safe storage state, at the Darlington refurbishment and operations, or at the potential new build at Darlington.

OPG has begun planning for the station's end of commercial operations including the potential repurposing of the Pickering site location.

OPG will proceed with a detailed planning phase for the mid-life refurbishment of the Darlington Nuclear Generating Station east of Toronto, with construction expected to start in 2016. The business decision to move forward with an investment in Darlington came after initial studies on the plant's condition operating performance returned positive results.

In January 2016, the Province of Ontario announced its decision to proceed with refurbishment of Darlington.

In September 2022, The Province of Ontario announced its support for the continued operation of the Pickering Nuclear plant beyond its previously set closure date. Simultaneously, the province also announced its support for a refurbishment of Pickering B to allow for an additional 30 years of operation which would provide long-term stability to Ontario's electricity grid, and ensure a continued supply of cobalt-60 of which Pickering currently supplies 10% of all cobalt-60 used worldwide.

Incidents

A serious incident occurred on 1 August 1983. Pressure tube G16 in the Pickering A Unit 2 reactor developed a 2 metre long split. The reactor was safely shut down and the damage investigated. The cause was found to be the mis-location of annulus gas spacer springs which allowed the hot pressure tube to sag and touch the inside of the cold calandria tube leading to hydrogen enrichment of the cooler areas. This created a series of small cracks which linked up and caused the long rupture. There was some local fuel damage and the reactor was safely shut down by the operators with no increase in radioactive emissions. The eventual resolution was Large Scale Fuel Channel Replacement and all the pressure tubes were replaced in all Pickering A reactors. The new pressure tubes were supported by an improved design of the annulus gas spacer springs. Since then, careful monitoring of the location of the annulus gas spacer rings has been a significant part of routine reactor inspections.

On December 10, 1994 there was a loss of coolant accident. It is said to be the most serious accident in Canadian history (June 2001) by The Standing Senate Committee on Energy, the Environment and Natural Resources. The Emergency Core Cooling System was used to prevent a meltdown.

On March 14, 2011, there was a leak of 73 cubic metres of demineralized water into Lake Ontario from a failed pump seal. There was negligible risk to the public according to the Canadian Nuclear Safety Commission.

2020 nuclear incident alert 

On January 12, 2020 at 7:24 a.m. ET, an emergency alert was issued via Alert Ready on all radio stations, television stations, television providers, and wireless networks in the province of Ontario, containing an advisory of an unspecified "incident" that had been reported and was being addressed at the plant. The alert stated that no immediate action was required for those within  of the plant. Approximately 40 minutes later, OPG issued a statement via Twitter that the alert had been sent in error, and a second emergency alert was issued at around 9:10 a.m. with a similar message cancelling the previous alert.

Solicitor General Sylvia Jones stated that the alert was accidentally issued during a "routine training exercise" by Ontario's emergency operations centre. The incident prompted criticism from government officials, including MPP Peter Tabuns, Pickering mayor Dave Ryan, and Toronto mayor John Tory.

The false alarm also prompted renewed interest in preparedness for actual nuclear accidents: OPG reported a surge in the sales of potassium iodide kits via its "Prepare to Be Safe" website between January 12 and 13, increasing from its monthly average of 100 to 200, to over 32,000. The website is applicable for those who live within  of the plant; per Canadian Nuclear Safety Commission (CNSC) requirements, OPG is required to distribute these pills to all residences within  of a nuclear facility.

See also

 List of largest power stations in Canada
 List of nuclear reactors in Canada
 Nuclear power in Canada
 Darlington Nuclear Generating Station
 Bruce Nuclear Generating Station
 Point Lepreau Nuclear Generating Station
 Fitzpatrick Nuclear Generating Station
 Nine Mile Point Nuclear Generating Station
 Frenchman's Bay

References

External links

 Ontario Power Generation
 Google maps satellite image

Nuclear power stations in Ontario
Ontario Hydro
Ontario Power Generation
Pickering, Ontario
Nuclear power stations using CANDU reactors
Buildings and structures in the Regional Municipality of Durham
Energy infrastructure completed in 1971
Energy infrastructure completed in 1983
1971 establishments in Ontario